Zimnice Wielkie  (German Groß Schimnitz) is a village in the administrative district of Gmina Prószków, within Opole County, Opole Voivodeship, in south-western Poland.

References

Zimnice Wielkie